Vitré Communauté is the communauté d'agglomération, an intercommunal structure, centred on the town of Vitré. It is located in the Ille-et-Vilaine department, in the Bretagne region, northwestern France. It was created in 2002. Its population was 81,205 in 2018, of which 18,267 in Vitré proper. It has an area of 867.7 km2.

Composition
The communauté d'agglomération consists of the following 46 communes:

Argentré-du-Plessis
Availles-sur-Seiche
Bais
Balazé
Bréal-sous-Vitré
Brielles
Champeaux
La Chapelle-Erbrée
Châteaubourg
Châtillon-en-Vendelais
Cornillé
Domagné
Domalain
Drouges
Erbrée
Étrelles
Gennes-sur-Seiche
La Guerche-de-Bretagne
Landavran
Louvigné-de-Bais
Marpiré
Mecé
Mondevert
Montautour
Montreuil-des-Landes
Montreuil-sous-Pérouse
Moulins
Moussé
Moutiers
Le Pertre
Pocé-les-Bois
Princé
Rannée
Saint-Aubin-des-Landes
Saint-Christophe-des-Bois
Saint-Didier
Saint-Germain-du-Pinel
Saint-Jean-sur-Vilaine
Saint-M'Hervé
La Selle-Guerchaise
Taillis
Torcé
Val-d'Izé
Vergéal
Visseiche
Vitré

See also
 Agglomeration communities in France

References

Vitre
Vitre